In mechanical engineering, a shaft is a rotating machine element, usually circular in cross section, which is used to transmit power from one part to another, or from a machine which produces power to a machine which absorbs power.

Types
They are mainly classified into two types.
 Transmission shafts are used to transmit power between the source and the machine absorbing power; e.g. counter shafts and line shafts.
 Machine shafts are the integral part of the machine itself; e.g. crankshaft.
Axle shaft. 
Spindle shaft.

Materials
The material used for ordinary shafts is mild steel. When high strength is required, an alloy steel such as nickel, nickel-chromium or chromium-vanadium steel is used. Shafts are generally formed by hot rolling and finished to size by cold drawing or turning and grinding.

Standard sizes
Source:

Machine shafts
 Up to 25 mm steps of 0.5 mm

Transmission shafts
 25 mm to 60 mm with 5 mm steps
 60 mm to 110 mm with 10 mm steps
 110 mm to 140 mm with 15 mm steps
 140 mm to 500 mm with 20 mm steps

The standard lengths of the shafts are 5 m, 6 m and 7 m.

Usually 1m to 5m is used.

Stresses
The following stresses are induced in the shafts.
 Shear stresses due to the transmission of torque (due to torsional load).
 Bending stresses (tensile or compressive) due to the forces acting upon the machine elements like gears and pulleys as well as the self weight of the shaft.
 Stresses due to combined torsional and bending loads.

References

External links
Online verification of shafts according standard

Machines
Mechanical engineering
Kinematics
Articles containing video clips
Shaft drives